Jalan Tun Sambanthan (formerly Jalan Brickfields) is a major road in Kuala Lumpur, Malaysia. It was built in 1982 and named after Tun V.T. Sambanthan, a former Minister of Works and Communications and one of the founding fathers of Malaysia.

Landmarks
Along Jalan Tun Sambanthan is the century-old Young Men's Christian Association (YMCA), which has become a landmark in Brickfields. Further down along Jalan Tun Sambanthan is the Vivekananda Ashram that was built in the early 19th century.

The road connects motorists to KL Sentral, Dayabumi and Jalan Bangsar.

List of junctions

Roads in Kuala Lumpur